Another Democracy is Possible  was a Spanish activist group (2003~2006), claiming for more democracy (fair electoral systems, participative and direct democracy, popular initiatives, and so on).

It carried out several Trojan activities; for instance taking part of national, regional and local polls as an extraparliamentary Spanish political party. Not to ask for votes rather to promote its activist message by including its shocking logo into the electoral ballots and getting media visibility.

External links
Another Democracy is Possible Quim Gil, 4 July 2003, Mute Vol. 1, Nº 26 (Summer-Autumn 2003)

Defunct political parties in Spain
2003 establishments in Spain
2006 disestablishments in Spain